Rupert Rennison Beetham (August 29, 1877 – May 5, 1933) was a Republican politician in the U.S. state of Ohio who was Speaker of the Ohio House of Representatives 1921–1922.

Beetham was born in Greensburg, Trumbull County, Ohio. He was educated at the Canton High School, Scio College and the Ohio State University School of Law. He lettered in Football at Ohio State in for the 1899 team with a record of 9–0–1.

Beetham was a lawyer, farmer, and teacher. He belonged to the Free Masons and the Knights of Pythias. He was a member of the School board of Cadiz Schools starting in 1904, and served as postmaster of Cadiz, Ohio from 1906–1914. He was married and lived in Cadiz. He was a Methodist.

He died at a Columbus hospital of complications of arteriosclerosis in 1933. He had been in declining health for several years. He was 55. He had previously been the prohibition director in the administration of governor Myers Y. Cooper. His funeral was held May 7, 1933 in Cadiz.

Footnotes

References

People from Cadiz, Ohio
Speakers of the Ohio House of Representatives
Republican Party members of the Ohio House of Representatives
Ohio lawyers
People from Trumbull County, Ohio
Ohio postmasters
Ohio State Buckeyes football players
1877 births
1933 deaths
Ohio State University Moritz College of Law alumni